= Kehro =

Kehro is a band from Finland. It plays instrumental music, mainly composed by its members. Kehro music includes elements of lounge, folk, Latino, afro, and bossa nova music. The name Kehro comes from a village in Finland.

== Members ==
- Vesa Kaartinen
- Ville Toikka
- Markku Kyyhkynen

In addition to the 3 permanent members, the band has had many visiting musicians.

== Albums ==
- Kehro Urdiala (2019)
- Kehro Jalousie (2021)
- Kehro Hamlet (2022)
